Strom Thurmond High School (STHS) is a four year high school located in Johnston, a town in Edgefield County, South Carolina, United States. It is named for Strom Thurmond, who served as Governor of South Carolina (1947–1951), and was an eight-term senator from South Carolina (1954–1956 and 1956–2003) and it is home of the rebels.

Notable alumni
 Antonio Hamilton, National Football League (NFL) player
 Jakar Hamilton, NFL player
 Childish Major, musician

References

Schools in Edgefield County, South Carolina
Educational institutions in the United States with year of establishment missing
Public high schools in South Carolina
Educational institutions established in 1961
1961 establishments in South Carolina